This is a list of association football players that have scored three goals (a hat-trick) or more in a single match in the Brunei Super League since its first edition in 2012. The first person who achieved this was Safuan Juhar for LLRC FT on 16 December 2012 against Najip FC.

Hat-tricks

References

Hat-trick
Brunei Super League